Vincent Gardner (born October 31, 1972) is an American trombonist and composer.

Gardner has released six albums on SteepleChase Records and also performs and records in a group with his brother, trumpeter Derrick Gardner.

He is the lead trombonist for the Jazz at Lincoln Center Orchestra.

Discography

As leader
 2005: Elbow Room (SteepleChase)
 2006: The Good Book, Ch. 1 (SteepleChase)
 2007: The Good Book, Ch. 2 (SteepleChase)
 2008: Vin-Slidin'  (SteepleChase)
 2009: Three-Five (SteepleChase)
 2012: The Good Book, Ch. 3 (SteepleChase)

As sideman
 1997: Blues for the New Millennium, Marcus Roberts (Columbia)
 1998: New York in the Fifties, Steve Allee (Alley Oop)
 1998: Priority Soul, Brad Leali (Jazzworld.com)
 2000: Dear Louis, Nicholas Payton (Verve)
 2001: All Rise, Wynton Marsalis (Sony Classical)
 2002: Reel Time, Wynton Marsalis (Sony Classical)
 2003: Salt, Lizz Wright (Verve)
 2003: Slim Goodie, Derrick Gardner and the Jazz Prophets (Impact Music)
 2003: We Do it Different, Frank Foster's Loud Minority Big Band (Mapleshade)
 2004: A Love Supreme, Jazz at Lincoln Center Orchestra (Palmetto)
 2005: Don't Be Afraid: The Music of Charles Mingus, Jazz at Lincoln Center Orchestra (Palmetto)
 2005: Jam Session Vol. 20, Vincent Gardner, Andre Hayward, Danny Kirkhum (SteepleChase)
 2006: Jam Session Vol. 23, Vincent Gardner, Wycliffe Gordon, Conrad Herwig (SteepleChase)
 2008: A Ride to the Other Side, Derrick Gardner and the Jazz Prophets (Owl Studios)
 2009: Echoes of Ethnicity, Derrick Gardner and the Jazz Prophets + 2 (Owl Studios)

References

1972 births
Living people
American jazz trombonists
Male trombonists
SteepleChase Records artists
21st-century trombonists
21st-century American male musicians
American male jazz musicians
Jazz at Lincoln Center Orchestra members